The CrustaStun is a device designed to administer a lethal electric shock to shellfish (such as lobsters, crabs, and crayfish) before cooking.  This avoids boiling a live shellfish which may be able to experience pain in a way similar to vertebrates.  The CrustaStun comprises a stainless-steel box approximately the size of a domestic microwave oven containing a tray with a wet sponge and an electrode. The shellfish is placed in the box and when the lid is closed, the wet sponge conducts the current which electrocutes the animal with a 120 volt 2–5 amp current. It is reported the CrustaStun renders the shellfish unconscious in 0.3 seconds and kills the animal in 5 to 10 seconds, compared to 3 minutes to kill a lobster by boiling or 4.5 minutes for a crab.

The inventor of the device, Simon Buckhaven, worked for two years with scientists from the University of Bristol to develop the device which is manufactured by a company in England, at an estimated cost of £2,500 (in 2009).

There are claims that shellfish killed with the CrustaStun taste better than those killed by boiling. Waitrose, Tesco and other major supermarkets in the United Kingdom have insisted that all shellfish products supplied to them are killed using this method.

See also
 Pain in crustaceans

References

Further reading
Original producer's website (archived of)
Mitchell & Cooper, current producer's product listing
BBC article on the device and its inventor

Animal welfare
Euthanasia
Goods manufactured in England
Kitchenware brands